Taguba may refer to:

 Antonio Taguba (born 1950), Filipino-American United States Army general
 Taguba Report, Antonio Taguba's report into the Abu Ghraib torture and prisoner abuse scandals
TAGUBA, a group of Amazonian warriors from the Filipino television series Mulawin

See also